This is the list of cities in Ilam Province as of latest census of Iran (2016), ranked by population.

List

See also 
List of counties in Ilam Province, Iran

List of cities in Iran by province

Ilam Province

References 

 2016 Census of Iran. Statistical Center of Iran.

Cities in Ilam Province
Iran geography-related lists